Bar Aftab-e Zirdu (also Romanized as Bar Āftāb-e Zīrdū; also known as Bar Āftāb-e Bakhs) is a village in Rostam-e Yek Rural District, in the Central District of Rostam County, Fars Province, Iran. At the 2006 census, its population was 128, in 25 families.

References 

Populated places in Rostam County